Jaroslav Janus (born 21 September 1989) is a Slovak professional ice hockey goaltender. He is currently playing for HC Košice of the Slovak Extraliga. 

Janus was selected by the Tampa Bay Lightning in the 6th round (162nd overall) of the 2008 NHL Entry Draft.

Playing career
As a youth, Janus played in his native Slovakia, within the junior program of HC Slovan Bratislava. After his selection to the Lightning in the 2009 NHL Entry Draft, Janus opted to continue his development in North America, playing major junior hockey with the Erie Otters of the Ontario Hockey League (OHL). On December 31, 2009, the Tampa Bay Lightning signed Janus to a three-year, entry-level contract.

Janus made his professional debut with the Lightning's American Hockey League (AHL) affiliate, the Norfolk Admirals, in the 2009–10 season.

Janus claimed the Calder Cup, as the backup with the Admirals in the 2011–12 season, but upon being unable to earn a NHL recall through the duration of his rookie contract with the Lightning he opted to return as a restricted free agent to his original club, HC Slovan Bratislava of the Kontinental Hockey League (KHL) on September 8, 2012.

International play
As a member of Team Slovakia, Janus competed at the 2009 World Junior Ice Hockey Championships where he was named to the IIHF World U20 Championship All-Star Team.

Awards and honours

References

External links
 

1989 births
Living people
HC Bílí Tygři Liberec players
Erie Otters players
Florida Everblades players
HC Litvínov players
HC Slovan Bratislava players
Norfolk Admirals players
Slovak ice hockey goaltenders
HC Sparta Praha players
Tampa Bay Lightning draft picks
Sportspeople from Prešov
SaiPa players
Rytíři Kladno players
Fehérvár AV19 players
HC Košice players
Slovak expatriate ice hockey players in the United States
Slovak expatriate ice hockey players in the Czech Republic
Slovak expatriate ice hockey players in Finland
Expatriate ice hockey players in Hungary
Slovak expatriate sportspeople in Hungary